The 2005 California Golden Bears football team represented the University of California, Berkeley in the 2005 NCAA Division I-A football season. They played their home games at California Memorial Stadium in Berkeley, California and were coached by Jeff Tedford.

At the beginning of the season quarterback Nate Longshore was chosen to succeed Aaron Rodgers as the starting quarterback. However he was injured during the first game of the season and replaced by Joe Ayoob for the next nine games. The Bears got off to their best start, at 5–0, since Steve Mariucci coached them in 1996. But then stumbled and lost four of their next five games. Third string quarterback Steve Levy, replaced Ayoob, and was named as the starter for the Big Game. Levy played as fullback during the previous season, in his first time as a starter he led the team to defeat Stanford 27-3. The team ended up in the 2005 Las Vegas Bowl, where they beat BYU, 35–28.

Schedule

Game summaries

Washington

Source: ESPN

USC

Cal then hosted the #1-ranked USC Trojans, led by head coach Pete Carroll and an offense including Heisman Trophy-winning quarterback Matt Leinart and running back Reggie Bush. The Trojans scored first after Ayoob's first of four interceptions in the game, on a LenDale White rush. Ayoob recovered after the interception, and led the Bears to a field goal to cut their deficit to four at the end of the first quarter. In the second quarter, Leinart rushed for a pair of touchdowns to give the Trojans a 21–3 lead at half-time. After a pair of White rushing touchdowns, the Bears scored again on a Chris Manderino rush that ended scoring in the game, with the Trojans winning 35–10. With the win, the Trojans clinched at least a share of the Pac-10 title.

Stanford

Source: 
    
    
    
    
    

Steve Levy had 125 yards passing and Marshawn Lynch had 123 yards running.

References

California
California Golden Bears football seasons
Las Vegas Bowl champion seasons
California Golden Bears football